Newton Aubrey Williams Richards (born 2 January 2001) is a Panamanian professional footballer who plays as a forward for Campeonato Paulista club Palmeiras.

Career

At the age of 16, Williams trialed for the youth academy of Brazilian side Grêmio.

He started his career with Panamanian second division side Costa del Este.

Before the 2020 season, Williams signed for Spartaks in Latvia.

Before the 2021 season, he signed for Palmeiras;

References

External links

 
 

Panamanian footballers
Panamanian expatriate footballers
Expatriate footballers in Brazil
Living people
2001 births
Association football forwards
Liga Panameña de Fútbol players
Latvian Higher League players
Sociedade Esportiva Palmeiras players
FK Spartaks Jūrmala players
Costa del Este F.C. players
Expatriate footballers in Latvia